Elections for the Pennsylvania State Senate were held on November 2, 2004, with even-numbered districts being contested. State Senators are elected for four-year terms, with half of the Senate seats up for a vote every two years. The term of office for those elected in 2004 will run from January 4, 2005 through November 2008. Necessary primary elections were held on April 27, 2004.

Bob Regola, a Republican member of the Hempfield Township Board of Supervisors, defeated Democratic senator Allen G. Kukovich in the 39th senatorial district. Republican State Representative Pat Vance succeeded the retiring Republican Senator Harold F. Mowrey, Jr. Four senators who won special elections prior to the 2004 election, Dominic F. Pileggi, Connie Williams, John R. Gordner, and John Pippy, each won full terms.

General Elections

References
 
 
 

2004 Pennsylvania elections
2004
Pennsylvania Senate